It Doesn't Have to Be This Way is a post apocalyptic novel by Alistair Mackay. It was published by Kwela Books in 2022. It is Mackay's debut novel set in post-apocalyptic Cape Town.

Reception 
It made Brittle Paper'''s Notable Books of 2022. Sarah Hoek of Daily Maverick'' calls it "an exquisitely crafted story of love and loss, identity and humanity".

References 

2022 novels
LGBT novels
Post-apocalyptic novels
South African novels